Warren Garst (December 4, 1850 – October 5, 1924) was an American politician, Iowa State Senator, a member of the Republican Party, the Lieutenant Governor of Iowa, and the 19th Governor of Iowa.

Biography
Warren Garst was born to Dr. Michael Garst and Marie Louise Morrison in Dayton, Ohio. At age 8 he and his family moved to Champaign, Illinois. At age 19 he moved to Iowa to start his business career. He and his brother went to Coon Rapids, Iowa to open a general store called "The Garst Store". He later co-founded Iowa Savings Bank in Coon Rapids.

Garst and Elizabeth Johnson had one child, Ada Belle Garst. He was later married to Clara H. Clark and had two children: Louise Garst and Warren Carroll Garst Jr.

Garst started his political career when he became a member of the Iowa Senate. He served in the 25th through 31st General Assemblies. He was nominated for lieutenant governor at the Republican Convention in 1906 and was inaugurated on January 17, 1907. When Governor Albert B. Cummins was elected into the United States Senate he was elevated to the position of Governor of Iowa. During his short time as governor he carried out the Cummins administration's policies. He was urged to run for a full term as governor, but lost the 1910 Republican primary to State Auditor Beryl F. Carroll 49% to 35%.

He died on October 5, 1924 and was buried at the Glendale Cemetery in Des Moines, Iowa.

References

1850 births
1924 deaths
Republican Party governors of Iowa
Republican Party Iowa state senators
Lieutenant Governors of Iowa
Politicians from Dayton, Ohio
People from Carroll County, Iowa
American businesspeople
Place of death missing
Burials in Iowa
20th-century American politicians